The 2021 Open Città della Disfida was a professional tennis tournament played on clay courts. It was the 21st edition of the tournament which was part of the 2021 ATP Challenger Tour. It took place in Barletta, Italy between 23 and 29 August 2021.

Due to COVID-19 pandemic, the 2020 edition of the tournament was not held and the 2021 edition was rescheduled from the traditional dates in April.

Singles main-draw entrants

Seeds

 1 Rankings are as of 16 August 2021.

Other entrants
The following players received wildcards into the singles main draw:
  Jacopo Berrettini
  Emiliano Maggioli
  Luca Nardi

The following player received entry into the singles main draw using a protected ranking:
  Jeremy Jahn

The following player received entry into the singles main draw as an alternate:
  Francesco Forti

The following players received entry from the qualifying draw:
  Nicolás Álvarez
  Ryan Harrison
  Cristian Rodríguez
  Andrea Vavassori

Champions

Singles

 Giulio Zeppieri def.  Flavio Cobolli 6–1, 3–6, 6–3.

Doubles

 Marco Bortolotti /  Cristian Rodríguez def.  Gijs Brouwer /  Jelle Sels 6–2, 6–4.

References

Open Città della Disfida
2021
2021 in Italian tennis
August 2021 sports events in Italy